Unnop Thongborisut; (born 27 September 1993), simply known as Por, is a Thai singer, actor and the winner of the 7th season of reality talent show True Visions' Academy Fantasia.

Biography 
Unnop Thongborisut was born in Uttaradit province, Thailand. He has two brothers named Pan and Plam. He graduated from Marie Vithaya School and received a bachelor's degree from the Faculty of Science at Chulalongkorn University.  He currently studies at Ramkhamhaeng University, Faculty of Mass Communication.

In 2010, Unnop Thongborisut auditioned for the seventh season of True Academy Fantasia. He made it through the final audition round to compete in the show and continued two audition weeks to be one of 12 finalists in the house, then the winner of the season.

Filmography

TV Dramas

TV Series

TV Sitcom

Film

Master of Ceremony: MC

Television 
 2021 : รายการ ชีพจรลงพุง (ผลิตรายการโดย) ทุกวันเสาร์ถึงวันอาทิตย์ เวลา 09.00-09.30 น. On Air Amarin TV (เริ่มวันที่ 2 มกราคม 2564-ปัจจุบัน) ร่วมกับ ลิตา อินท์ชลิตา 
 2021 : รายการ เผ็ดมันส์บันเทิง (ผลิตรายการโดย) ทุกวันจันทร์ถึงวันศุกร์ เวลา 11.10 น. On Air Ch.8 ร่วมกับ Anna TV-Pool, Primrata Dejudom, Napapa Tantrakul, (เริ่มวันจันทร์ที่ 8 มีนาคม พ.ศ. 2564-ปัจจุบัน)
 2021 : รายการ ไลท์สไตล์ ไทยแลนด์ (ผลิตรายการโดย ห้างหุ้นส่วนจำกัด บ้านไทยลูกทุ่ง) ทุกวันอาทิตย์ เวลา 12.45-13.10 น. On Air 5HD5 (เริ่มวันที่ 23 พฤษภาคม 2564-ปัจจุบัน) ร่วมกับ ท็อป-ศราวุธ พลอยประดับ, มงคล สะอาดบุญญพัฒน์ (นาย The Comedian Thailand), นพดล ดำรง (แน็คกี้ The Comedian Thailand), พีท ธนบดี 
 2021 : รายการ ลูกทุ่งประเทศไทย (ผลิตรายการโดย ห้างหุ้นส่วนจำกัด บ้านไทยลูกทุ่ง) ทุกวันเสาร์ เวลา 14.30-15.30 น. On Air 5HD5 (เริ่มวันที่ 19 มิถุนายน 2564-ปัจจุบัน) ร่วมกับ ท็อป-ศราวุธ พลอยประดับ
 2022 : รายการ สงครามไมค์ (ผลิตรายการโดย OneSiam Entertainment) ทุกวันอาทิตย์ เวลา 18.00-19.00 น. On Air Ch.9 (เริ่มวันอาทิตย์ที่ 1 พฤศจิกายน พ.ศ. 2565-ปัจจุบัน)

Online 
 20 : - On Air YouTube:

Music video

Discography

Songs

OST

Live shows

Stage play

Concert

References

External links 
 Twitter Por af7
 Instagram Por af7

Living people
1993 births
Unnop Thongborisut
Unnop Thongborisut
Unnop Thongborisut
Unnop Thongborisut
Unnop Thongborisut
Unnop Thongborisut
Unnop Thongborisut
Unnop Thongborisut
Thai television personalities
Unnop Thongborisut